The CJ-10 is a second-generation Chinese ground-based land-attack missile. It is derived from the Kh-55 missile. It is reportedly manufactured by the China Aerospace Science and Industry Corporation Third Academy and the China Haiying Electro-Mechanical Technology Academy.

Initially, the CJ-10 was identified as the DH-10 by Western media and analysts. United States Department of Defense reports used "DH-10" until 2011, and then "CJ-10" from 2012. Publications may use both terms interchangeably. The Center for Strategic and International Studies believes that the CJ-10 is a member of the Hongniao (HN) series of missiles; Ian Easton believes that the CJ-10 is the same missile as the HN-2, and that the HN-3 is the "DH-10A".

Description
In the September 2014 edition of Joint Forces Quarterly, an article reportedly described CJ-10 as a subsonic missile with a range of more than 1,500 km and a 500 kg payload. The article attributes the missile having a guidance package using inertial navigation system, satellite navigation, Terrain Contour Matching, and a likely Digital Scene-Mapping Area Correlator for terminal guidance. Ships and ground transporter erector launchers were listed as launch platforms.

In 2004, the CJ-10 was credited with a CEP of 10 m.

The missile can be air-launched by the H-6 bomber and fired from a vertical launch system of the Type 055 destroyer according to Chinese expert Li Li on Chinese television. The YJ-100 will have an onboard radar and is potentially a counter to the American Long Range Anti-Ship Missile (LRASM).
|

Development
The development of the CJ-10 could have potentially benefited significantly from Chinese acquisition of NATO and Soviet missile technology in the 1990s, notably the Kh-55 (purchased from Ukraine), and the Tomahawk missiles (that were unexploded and purchased from Iraq, Pakistan, and Serbia). The detailed production engineering data packages of the Kh-55 LACM were bought from Ukraine in 2001. A 1995 Russian document suggested a complete production facility had been transferred to Shanghai, for the development of a nuclear-armed cruise missile. Originally it was thought that this was based on the 300 km-range Raduga Kh-15 (AS-16 'Kickback'), but it now appears that it was the Kh-55 that was transferred to China.

Jane's Information Group reported the CJ-10 was tested 2004. An August 2012 report by Jane's indicated that a shipborne variance of the missile may have been tested on Bi Sheng, a Chinese weapons trial ship.

The United States in 2008 estimated that 50–250 missiles were in service, increasing to 150–350 in 2009.

Variants
CJ-10
CJ-10K
Air-launched version with a 1500 km range; may be carried by the Xian H-6K.
DF-10A
Ground attack cruise missile. Reportedly a stealthier, more accurate, version of the CJ-10.
"DH-2000"
Supposedly a supersonic version of the DH-10A.
CJ-20
Reportedly been tested on the Xian H-6; each bomber may carry four missiles externally.
YJ-100
Anti-ship missile version with an 800 km range, launched by H-6 bomber and Type 055 destroyer.

Operators

People's Liberation Army Rocket Force: 200–500 CJ-10 (est. )

See also
YJ-62 – similar anti-ship missile
CJ-100

References

Bibliography

External links 
DH-10 / CJ-10 / Land-Attack Cruise Missiles (LACM)
Photos of different variants

Cruise missiles
Weapons of the People's Republic of China
Nuclear cruise missiles of the People's Republic of China
Military equipment introduced in the 2000s